Luis Pratsmasó Parera (September 9, 1916 – 18 July 2003) was a Spanish field hockey player. He competed in the 1948 Summer Olympics.

He was a member of the Spanish field hockey team, which was eliminated in the group stage. He played all two matches as forward in the tournament.

Bibliography 
 Sports-Reference profile

External links
 
Luis Pratsmasó's profile at the Spanish Olympic Committee

1916 births
2003 deaths
Spanish male field hockey players
Olympic field hockey players of Spain
Field hockey players at the 1948 Summer Olympics